Charles Harry Epps, Jr. (born July 24, 1930) is an American orthopaedic surgeon who served as Dean of the Howard University College of Medicine.

Early life and education 
Epps was born in Baltimore and grew up in Pimlico. At the age of six he first noticed how unequal his society was, with the separate white school being better equipped than his own. By the age of fifteen, Epps lost his father to a heart attack. He attended Frederick Douglass High School, where he graduated as valedictorian. He was appointed to the Maryland State Boys' State Senate, where he successfully called for the elimination of segregated public transport. He was encouraged by his high school biology teacher to study chemistry at Howard University. He earned his medial degree from Howard University, graduating magna cum laude. In an interview with The Washington Post, Epps said that as a Black medical student in the 1940s he could only study at Howard University or the Meharry Medical College. Throughout his medical degree he drove a taxicab. He specialised in orthopaedic surgery at Freedmen's Hospital, and was only the fifth African-American in history to become an orthopaedic surgeon.

Research and career 
After his residency, Epps joined the Medical Corps where he was made a Captain. He was honourably discharged in 1962, and returned to Washington, D.C. to start his own medical practise. Epps was elected President of the American Orthopaedic Association in 1986, and was the first African-American person to hold such a position. In 1988 Epps was made Dean of the Howard University College of Medicine. His leadership resulted in a significant increase in endowment funding as well as several new research chairs.

In 1994 Epps was made chief executive officer of the Howard University Hospital. He was awarded the American Academy of Orthopaedic Surgeons Humanitarian Award in 2000, and the Marymount University Ethics Award in 2003. Epps retired from Howard University College of Medicine in 2001. In 2008 Howard University College of Medicine established the Charles H. Epps, Jr. Chair in Orthopaedic Surgery.

Personal life 
Epps was married to Roselyn P. Epps, the first African-American President of the American Medical Women's Association and the first African-American and first female president of the District of Columbia Chapter of the American Academy of Pediatrics. Roselyn passed away in December 2014.

Selected publications

References 

American orthopedic surgeons
Living people
1930 births